Áta is a village in Baranya county, Hungary.

Etymology 
Áta is a Turkish name which means father. Áta is also used in Atatürk's name.

History 
Áta has been inhabited since ancient times. Before the Hungarian tribes conquered the area, it was inhabited by Slav people.
In 1526 the county was occupied by Ottomans, and was freed in 1689.

External links 
 Street map 

Populated places in Baranya County